The William Anderson General Merchandise Store (also known as Anderson's Corner) is a historic site in Redland, Florida, United States. Built in 1911 by William “Popp” Anderson, who worked for railroad magnate Henry Flagler, the wood-frame structure is located at 15700 Southwest 232nd Street. It served as a general store for the thriving Redlands agricultural community until the 1930s, when it was converted into apartments. Condemned in 1975, it was granted a reprieve for rehabilitation, and was eventually converted into the successful Harvest House restaurant. After being ravaged by Hurricane Andrew in 1992, the building was partially restored, although it has remained vacant since.

On October 18, 1977, it was added to the National Register of Historic Places. It was designated a historic building by Miami-Dade County in 1981. As of 2019, it is on the Dade Heritage Trust list of the 12 Most Endangered Sites in Miami-Dade County.

References

External links

 Florida's Office of Cultural and Historical Programs
 Dade County listings
 Anderson's Corner

Anderson, William
Vernacular architecture in Florida
Commercial buildings completed in 1912
1912 establishments in Florida